Wang Ying is a fictional character in Water Margin, one of the Four Great Classical Novels of Chinese literature. Nicknamed "Stumpy Tiger", he ranks 58th among the 108 Stars of Destiny and 22nd among the 72 Earthly Fiends.

Background
Wang Ying, a good fighter with a short stature, is depicted as having sparkling eyes. His height is not specified in the novel, but some readers estimate that he is no taller than 1.5 meters. Wang transports passengers as a coachman for a living. One day, he finds the valuables of some customers so tempting that he robs them. He is later arrested. But he escapes from jail and becomes a bandit leader on Mount Qingfeng (清風山; in present-day Qingzhou, Shandong) under Yan Shun. Zheng Tianshou later joins them.

Meeting Song Jiang
When Song Jiang, on the run after killing his mistress Yan Poxi, is going to Qingfeng Fort (清風寨; near Mount Qingfeng) to take shelter under his friend Hua Rong, he passes by Mount Qingfeng and is captured in a trap by the bandits. The outlaws want to use his heart to make soup. Just as he is about to be sliced up, Song sighs loudly, "Am I, Song Jiang, destined to die just like this?" Surprised to hear the name of a person he greatly admires for chivalry, Yan Shun stops the killing in time and inquires. After confirming Song's identity, the three chiefs free him, offer their apologies and treat him as an honoured guest.

While they are drinking, Wang Ying, who covets pretty women, leaves the feast midway to intercept a group coming by Mount Qingfeng that includes a sedan chair, which apparently carries a lady. Finding the woman attractive, Wang takes her to the stronghold and intends to rape her. Just then the others come to his room. When the woman says she is the wife of Liu Gao, the governor of Qingfeng Fort, Song Jiang feels obliged to save her as Liu is the colleague of Hua Rong, the fort's garrison commandant. Wang reluctantly agrees to release her.

Joining Liangshan
On the Lantern Festival night, Song Jiang, who is then living in Hua Rong's house, goes outdoor to enjoy the celebrations. Liu Gao's wife spots him and lies to her husband that Song has abducted and almost raped her at Mount Qingfeng. Believing his wife, Liu orders Song Jiang arrested. After Hua Rong rescued Song by force, Liu seeks help from Murong Yanda, the governor of Qingzhou, which oversees Qingfeng Fort. Huang Xin, who is sent to handle the matter, lures Hua to a feast and captures him. Meanwhile, Liu has re-arrested Song as he tried to sneak to Mount Qingfeng.

When Huang Xin is taking Song Jiang and Hua Rong back to Qingzhou, the bandits of Mount Qingfeng waylay the convoy, rescue the two prisoners, and kill Liu Gao. The bandits later defeat an army sent from Qingzhou led by Qin Ming and seize Mrs Liu after breaking into Qingfeng Fort. Wang Ying again intends to keep Mrs Liu, but is prevented by Song Jiang and Yan Shun, who kills the woman whom they believe would cause harm to Wang. Song promises to find Wang, who nearly clashed with Yan, a more suitable woman to be his wife. As Qingzhou is likely to send a larger force, Song Jiang suggests that the group decamp to join Liangshan Marsh. Wang Ying is thus absorbed into the larger stronghold.

Marrying Hu Sanniang
The Zhu Family Manor, located close to Liangshan, refuses to release Shi Qian, whom it has captured after he stole a rooster for meal from its inn while on the way to join the stronghold. Song Jiang leads a military attack on the manor to settle the acrimony. After a futile first offensive, Liangshan launches the second one, which draws Hu Sanniang to come to the aid of the Zhus.

Hu Sanniang, the daughter of the squire of the neighbouring Hu Family Manor who is engaged to Zhu Biao of the Zhu Family Manor, comes charging on a horse at Song Jiang's army. Excited to see a pretty lady warrior, Wang Ying, who is involved in the offensive, takes on Hu in the belief that she would be easy prey. However, he underestimates the amazon, who detects that the guy has some indecent intent. Overwhelming Wang with her sabres, she suddenly leans forward, pulls him off his horse and throws him to the ground. Zhus' men rush forward to tie Wang up.

Hu Sanniang shows no sign of weariness as she battles Ou Peng and then Ma Lin. Suddenly Song Jiang finds himself being pursued by Hu on horse as his troops retreat in disarray. Hu comes close to seizing him when Lin Chong appears and intercepts her. She is easily defeated and captured by Lin, a far superior fighter. Song sends her in captivity to  Liangshan, where she is placed under the watch of his father. 

The outlaws eventually overrun the Zhu Family Manor thanks to the infiltration by Sun Li and free all the captured chieftains, including Wang Ying. Back at Liangshan, Song Jiang convinces Hu Sanniang, who has become the god daughter of Song's father while under the old man's care, to join the stronghold. He also arranges for her to marry Wang in fulfilment of his promise to find him a wife.

Campaigns and death
Wang Ying is appointed as one of the leaders of Liangshan's cavalry after the 108 Stars of Destiny came together in what is called the Grand Assembly. He participates in the campaigns against the Liao invaders and rebel forces in Song territory following amnesty from Emperor Huizong for Liangshan.

In the battle of Muzhou (睦州; in present-day Hangzhou, Zhejiang) in the campaign against Fang La, Wang Ying encounters the enemy general Zheng Biao. Disorientated by Zheng's magic, Wang is speared to death by the sorcerer. Hu Sanniang is eager to avenge her husband but is also killed by Zheng.

References
 
 
 
 
 
 
 

72 Earthly Fiends